The Andaman shrew or Andaman white-toothed shrew (Crocidura andamanensis) is a critically endangered species of mammal in the family Soricidae. It is endemic to the South Andaman Island of India. They are usually active by twilight or in the night and have specialized habitat requirements. Habitat loss due to selective logging, natural disasters such as tsunami and drastic weather change are thought to contribute to current population declines.

References

Crocidura
Endemic fauna of the Andaman Islands
Mammals of India
Critically endangered fauna of Asia
Mammals described in 1902
Taxonomy articles created by Polbot